Justin Pascal Keating (7 January 1930 – 31 December 2009) was an Irish Labour Party politician, broadcaster, journalist, lecturer and veterinary surgeon. In later life he was president of the Humanist Association of Ireland.

Keating was twice elected to Dáil Éireann and served in Liam Cosgrave's cabinet as Minister for Industry and Commerce from 1973 to 1977. He also gained election to Seanad Éireann and was a Member of the European Parliament. He was considered part of a "new wave" of politicians at the time of his entry to the Dáil.

Early life
He was born in Dublin in 1930, a son of the noted painter Seán Keating and campaigner May Keating. Keating was educated at Sandford Park School, and then at University College Dublin (UCD) and the University of London. He became a lecturer in anatomy at the UCD veterinary college from 1955 until 1960 and was senior lecturer at Trinity College Dublin from 1960 until 1965. He was RTÉ's head of agricultural programmes for two years before returning to Trinity College in 1967. While at RTÉ, he scripted and presented Telefís Feirme, a series for the agricultural community, for which he won a Jacob's Award in 1966.

Political career
In the 1950s and 1960s Keating was a member of the Communist Irish Workers' Party.
Keating was first elected to the Dáil as a Labour Party Teachta Dála (TD) for the Dublin County North constituency at the 1969 general election. From 1973 to 1977 he served in the National Coalition government under Liam Cosgrave as Minister for Industry and Commerce. In 1973 he was appointed a Member of the European Parliament from the Oireachtas, serving on the short-lived first delegation.

During 1975 Keating introduced the first substantial legislation for the development of Ireland's oil and gas. The legislation was modelled on international best practice and intended to ensure the Irish people would gain substantial benefit from their own oil and gas. Under Keating's legislation the state could by right acquire a 50% stake in any viable oil and gas reserves discovered. Production royalties of between 8% and 16% with corporation tax of 50% would accrue to the state. The legislation specified that energy companies would begin drilling within three years of the date of the issue of an exploration license.

He lost his Dáil seat at the 1977 general election, but was subsequently elected to Seanad Éireann on the Agricultural Panel, serving there until 1981. He briefly served again in the European Parliament from February to June 1984 when he replaced Séamus Pattison.

Later life and death
In the aftermath of President of Iran Mahmoud Ahmadinejad's "World Without Zionism" speech in 2005, Keating published an op-ed in The Dubliner Magazine, expressing his views on Israel. The article starts by claiming that "the Zionists have absolutely no right in what they call Israel". Keating then proceeds to explain why he thinks Israel has no right to exist, claiming that the Ashkenazi Jews are descended from Khazars.

Keating died on 31 December 2009, one week before his 80th birthday. Tributes came from the leaders of the Labour Party and Fine Gael at the time of his death, Eamon Gilmore and Enda Kenny, as well as former Fine Gael leader and Taoiseach John Bruton.

References

External links

1930 births
2009 deaths
Alumni of the University of London
Alumni of University College Dublin
Irish veterinarians
Jacob's Award winners
Labour Party (Ireland) TDs
Labour Party (Ireland) MEPs
Members of the 19th Dáil
Members of the 20th Dáil
Members of the 14th Seanad
MEPs for the Republic of Ireland 1973
MEPs for the Republic of Ireland 1979–1984
Academics of Trinity College Dublin
Politicians from Dublin (city)
RTÉ television presenters
People educated at Sandford Park School
Labour Party (Ireland) senators
Ministers for Enterprise, Trade and Employment